Ghazanchi or Kazanchi may refer to:

Ghazanchi, Armenia
Meghrashen, Armenia
Qazançı (disambiguation), places in Azerbaijan